Zaušje is a village in the municipality of Bileća, Republika Srpska, Bosnia and Herzegovina. Before 1992 large majority (99%) of the population consisted of Bosniaks.

References

Villages in Republika Srpska
Populated places in Bileća